Critical Path Institute (C-Path) is a non-profit organization created to improve the drug development process; its consortia include more than 1,600 scientists from government regulatory and research agencies, academia, patient organizations, and bio-pharmaceutical companies.

Background
The U.S. Food and Drug Administration (FDA) launched the Critical Path Initiative in 2004 to transform the way FDA-regulated medical products are developed, evaluated, and manufactured. C-Path was created as an independent organization to respond to the needs outlined in the FDA's initiative and with support and funding from the FDA, Science Foundation Arizona, and the Tucson, Arizona community. It operates as a neutral third party to enable scientists from the regulated industry and international regulatory agencies to work together with scientists from academia and patient groups to improve the drug development process.

Approach
In the interest of national and global public health, C-Path develops large databases of aggregated clinical trial data that can be used to study disease progression. These data are also used to develop and qualify biomarkers and clinical outcome assessment instruments that are shared with the greater community for use in drug development. C-Path also develops quantitative models to facilitate the design of efficient clinical trials.

C-Path Programs
C-Path programs are focused on reducing the time, cost, and risk of drug development and regulatory review. Where appropriate, C-Path forms consortia that are public/private partnerships that aim to improve the drug development process.

 The Predictive Safety Testing Consortium (PSTC) works to find improved safety biomarkers to detect drug induced toxicity.
 The Patient-Reported Outcome (PRO) Consortium develops, evaluates, and qualifies PRO instruments (e.g., questionnaires) for use in clinical trials designed to assess the safety and effectiveness of medical products.
 The Critical Path to TB Drug Regimens (CPTR) aims to accelerate the development of new, safe, and highly effective tuberculosis treatment regimens with shortened durations of therapy.
The Polycystic Kidney Disease (PKD) Consortium evaluates the evidence supporting total kidney volume (TKV) as a biomarker for assessing the progression of autosomal dominant PKD.
The Critical Path for Alzheimer's Disease (CPAD) aims to increase the efficiency of the development process of new treatments for Alzheimer disease (AD) and related neurodegenerative disorders with impaired cognition and function.
The Critical Path for Parkinson's (CPP) works to improve the clinical trial process.
The Data Collaboration Center (DCC) develops data solutions for scientific research.
The Duchenne Regulatory Science Consortium (D-RSC) supports collaborative research through shared data access and drug development tools.
The Electronic Patient-Reported Outcome Consortium (e-PRO) supports the collection of patient-focused outcomes data in clinical trials.
The Huntington's Disease Regulatory Science Consortium (HD-RSC) aims to accelerate the regulatory approval of Huntington's disease therapies.
The International Neonatal Consortium (INC) seeks to forge a predictable regulatory path for evaluating the safety and effectiveness of therapies for neonates.
The Multiple Sclerosis Outcome Assessments Consortium (MSOAC) works to qualify a new measure of disability as a primary or secondary endpoint for future trials of MS therapies.
The Type 1 Diabetes Consortium (T1D) works to qualify islet autoimmunity antibodies as prognostic biomarkers.
The goal of the Transplant Therapeutics Consortium (TTC) is to accelerate the medical product development process for transplantation.
The TB-Platform for Aggregation of Clinical TB Studies (TB-PACTS) curates and standardizes Phase III tuberculosis (TB) clinical trial data.
The successfully completed Pediatric Trials Consortium worked toward the efficient evaluation of innovative drugs, biologics, and devices for children.

Location
C-Path is headquartered in Tucson, Arizona. Raymond L. Woosley, M.D., Ph.D. founded C-Path in 2005 and is President Emeritus. Kristen Swingle is currently C-Path's Interim President and Chief Operating Officer. The Board of Directors includes Robert M. Califf, Wainwright Fishburn, Timothy R Franson, Kay Holcombe, Jeffrey E Jacob, former Pfizer CFO Alan Levin and biochemist Paula J. Olsiewski.

References

External links
 Critical Path Institute
 U.S. Food and Drug Administration
 National Institutes of Health
 European Medicines Agency

Pharmaceutical research institutes
Pharmaceutical industry
Drug discovery